Ahmed Ali is the name of:

Sportspeople
Ahmed Ali (sprinter) (born 1993), Sudanese sprinter
Ahmed Ali (Ghanaian athlete) (born 1972), Ghanaian sprinter
Ahmed Ali (handballer) (born 1973), Egyptian handballer
Ahmed Ali (footballer, born 1986), Egyptian striker
Ahmed Ali (footballer, born 1988), Egyptian defender
Ahmed Ali (footballer, born 1990), Emirati forward
Ahmed Abid Ali (born 1986), Iraqi football midfielder who played for Al Talaba in Iraq and the Iraq national team
Ahmed Ibrahim Ali (born 1970), UAE football midfielder who played for United Arab Emirates in the 1996 Asian Cup and also for Al-Sharjah
Ahmed Khalaf Ali, Egyptian Olympic gymnast
Ahmed Abdulla Ali (born 1987), Bahraini footballer
Ahmed Ali (Somali footballer) (born 1990)
Ahmed Rashed Ali (born 1988), Emirati footballer

Others
Ahmed Ali (Fijian politician) (1938–2005), Fijian academic and politician
Ahmed Ali Ahmed, former leader of al-Qaeda in Iraq
Ahmed Ali Butt (born 1975), Pakistani television actor, singer and model
Ahmed Ali Lahori (1887–1962), Sufi Muslim scholar
Ahmed Ali Moadhed (born 1980), Emirati footballer playing for Al Ain FC
Ahmed Ali (writer) (1910–1994), Pakistani novelist and poet
Ahmed Mohammed Ali (also known as Ahmed Ali, born 1972), Egyptian army spokesperson
Ahmed Farah Ali (born 1948), Somali literary scholar and publisher of written folklore
Ahmed Haj Ali, Eritrean politician who has held various posts within the Government of Eritrea
Ahmed Thasmeen Ali (born 1967), leader of Dhivehi Rayyithunge Party, a Maldivian MP, philanthropist and businessman
Ahmed Abdullah Ali, member of the 2006 transatlantic aircraft plot
Ahmed Diriye Ali, spokesman of the Hawiye traditional elders
Ahmed Ismail Ali (1917–1974), Commander-in-Chief of Egypt's army and minister of war during the October War of 1973
Ahmed Khalfan Ali (born c. 1974), conspirator of the al-Qaeda terrorist organization
Ahmed Sheikh Ali (born 1937), Somalian author and politician currently living in Nairobi, Kenya
Ahmed Ali (actor) (born 1986), Pakistani actor, model, singer and tennis player 
Ahmed Ali (Bangladeshi politician) (1932–2020), Bangladeshi politician and lawyer